Qujing is a prefecture-level city in the east of Yunnan province, China, bordering Guizhou province to the east and the Guangxi Zhuang Autonomous Region to the southeast; thus, it was called "Key between Yunnan and Guizhou" and "Throat of Yunnan" in the past. It is part of the Central Yunnan Metropolitan Region plan in effect for 2016–49. Its administrative population is 6,047,000 according to a 2015 estimate, of whom, 1,408,500 reside in the metro area, which contains Qilin District, Zhanyi District and Malong District. During the 11th National Five-Year Plan period, the government of Qujing planned to develop the city into the "big city at the origin of the Pearl River" in the following decades, including increasing the built-up urban area to past  and the urban population to surpass 1 million by 2020, the second in Yunnan, after Kunming.

Geography and climate

Like much of the central and eastern parts of the province, it is part of the Yunnan-Guizhou Plateau.

Tempered by the low latitude and moderate elevation, Qujing has a mild subtropical highland climate (Köppen Cwb), with short, mild, dry winters, and warm, rainy summers. A great majority of the year's rainfall occurs from June to October.

Transport
Qujing is linked to Kunming by the National Highway 320. Drive time is about three hours. The transportation system in Qujing is well developed. You can access almost every corner of the city by way of the Kun Qu Freeway. Buses to Kunming depart from Qujing Bus Station every half hour, the trip takes about three hours. The bus station also provides transportation to Dali, Honghezhou and other destinations around Qujing. Taxi and buses are available in Qujing. The base rate of a taxi is RMB 7 for the first .

Two train routes, Guizhou to Kunming and Nanning to Kunming, run through eight towns in Qujing each day. It takes one and a half hours to get from Qujing to Kunming by express. After Shanghai–Kunming high-speed railway completed in December 2016, it takes 45 minutes to reach Kunming South High-speed Train Station and an hour to reach Guiyang North High-speed Train Station from Qujing North High-speed Train Station. There is a plan for a speed train to run between Chengdu and Nanning by the year 2015, which will make the trip from Kunming to Qujing only 30 minutes long.

Administrative divisions

The government seat is located in Qilin District.

Economy
In 2016, total GDP was of 177.5 billion Yuan, and the GDP per capita of: 27044 yuans.

Tobacco, automobiles, power generation and chemical engineering are the main industries in Qujing.

Qujing Economic and Technological Development Zone
Qujing Economic and Technological Development Zone (QETDZ) is a provincial development zone approved by Yunnan Provincial Government in August 1992. It is located in the east of urban Qujing, the second largest city in Yunnan in terms of economic strengths. The location of the development zone is the economic, political and cultural center of Qujing. As an agency under Qujing municipal Party committee and municipal government, the administrative commission of QETDZ functions as an economy supervising body at the prefecture level and an administration body at the county level. It has  under its jurisdiction. It shoulders the task of building a new 40-square-kilometer city area and providing service for a population of 400,000 in the upcoming 10 years.

Ethnic groups
The Qujing Prefecture Almanac (1997:785) lists the following Yi subgroups.
Black Yi (autonym: Nuosupo )
White Yi (autonyms: Nasupo  and Azhepo )
Dry Yi (autonym: Gepo )

Sites of interest
Jiulong Waterfall (Nine Dragons Waterfall) in Luoping County
Tiansheng Cave, formerly Xianren Dong (Fairy Cave, although some translate it as Celestial Being Cave)

References

External links
Qujing City Official WebSite
Qujing News Network
Qujing in Yunnan
Qujing, Yunnan - introduction

 
Cities in Yunnan